Wayne County School District (WCSD) is a school district headquartered in Monticello, Kentucky. It serves Wayne County.

On June 30, 2013 Monticello Independent Schools closed and was merged into Wayne County Schools.

Schools
 Secondary
 Wayne County High School
 Wayne County Middle School
 Primary
 Bell Elementary School
 Monticello Elementary School
 Preschool
 Walker Early Learning Center
 Other
 Wayne County Area Technology Center (ATC)
Vocational education in the county has been provided by Wayne County Vocational School from 1971 to the present. Its name has changed several times during that period; it is presently knows as Wayne County Area Technology Center (ATC). It is managed by The Office Of Career And Technical Education. The school serves secondary students enrolled in Wayne County High School. Programs include Health Science, Welding, Carpentry, Machine Tool, Automotive, Industrial Maintenance, and Business.

References

External links
 

Education in Wayne County, Kentucky
School districts in Kentucky